Gillian Abel is a New Zealand public health researcher and as of 2021 head of the Department of Population Health at the University of Otago in Christchurch.

Education 
After a receiving a diploma from Cape Peninsula University of Technology in Cape Town, Abel moved to New Zealand in 1997 to work at the University of Otago. She graduated from Otago in 2010 with a PhD titled "Decriminalisation: A harm minimisation and human rights approach to regulating sex work".

Career 
Abel's early career focused on hematology before making a career change to focus on public health. In December 2019 Abel was promoted to full professor in the Department of Population Health at Otago with effect from 1 February 2020. She is also head of the Department.

Abel's research focuses on vulnerable populations, including sex workers, vulnerable youth, and Pacific people. Abel was involved in leading an influential research project funded by the Health Research Council, which analyzed the impact of the Prostitution Reform Act on the lives of sex workers. This study has informed policy-making in New Zealand and worldwide.

Research Interests 

 Sex work research, explicitly about stigma, decriminalization, and social change
 Youth physical and sexual health
 Community-based participatory research with street-based sex work
 Sex work employment rights
 Destigmatisation of HIV/AIDS

Selected publications

Books

Journal articles

References 

Living people
Year of birth missing (living people)
Cape Peninsula University of Technology alumni
University of Otago alumni
Academic staff of the University of Otago
Public health researchers
New Zealand women scientists